Cara Black and Liezel Huber were the defending champions, but lost in the quarterfinals to Yung-Jan Chan and Monica Niculescu.

Serena Williams and Venus Williams won in the final, 6–4, 6–1, against Yung-Jan Chan and Monica Niculescu.

Seeds

  Cara Black /  Liezel Huber (quarterfinals)
  Serena Williams /  Venus Williams (champions)
  Bethanie Mattek-Sands /  Nadia Petrova (semifinals)
  Sorana Cîrstea /  Maria Kirilenko (semifinals)

Draw

Draw 

Doubles
Bank of the West Classic
Bank of the West Classic - Doubles